Pamparomas may refer to a village and a district in Peru:

Pamparomas, a village in the Pamparomas District
Pamparomas District, a district in the Huaylas Province in the Ancash Region of Peru